Major General Alfred Henry Musson, CB, CBE, (14 August 1900 – 6 August 1995) was an English cricketer and British Army officer. A right-handed batsman and right-arm medium pace bowler, he played a first-class cricket match for the British Army cricket team against Cambridge University during the 1925 English cricket season. Between 1928 and 1931, he played three matches for Hong Kong against Shanghai.

He was an officer of the Royal Artillery and served in World War II.

References

1900 births
1995 deaths
People from Clitheroe
British Army generals
Companions of the Order of the Bath
Commanders of the Order of the British Empire
English cricketers
British Army cricketers
Royal Artillery officers
British Army personnel of World War II
Military personnel from Lancashire